The ice dancing competition of the figure skating at the 2015 Winter Universiade was held at the Universiade Igloo in Granada. The short dance was held on February 6 and the free dance was held on February 7.

Results

Short dance

Free dance

Overall

References

External links
 ISU Results Page

Ice dance